League tables for teams participating in Kakkonen, the third tier of the Finnish soccer league system, in 2011.

League tables

Group A

Group B

Group C

Promotion playoffs

Qualifying

BK-46 – Klubi 04 0 – 0
Klubi 04 – BK-46 0 – 1

BK-46 qualify for final 1 – 0

Ilves – SJK 1 – 2
SJK – Ilves 2 – 0

SJK qualify for final 4 – 1

Final

SJK – BK-46 3 – 0
BK-46 – SJK 1 – 2

SJK promoted 5 – 1 on aggregate

Footnotes

References and sources
 Finnish FA (Suomen Palloliitto - Kakkonen 2011)

Kakkonen seasons
3
Fin
Fin